The 1997 Nokia Cup, southern Ontario men's provincial curling championship was held February 4-9 at the Guelph Memorial Gardens in Guelph, Ontario. The winning rink of Ed Werenich, John Kawaja, Pat Perroud and Neil Harrison from the Churchill Curling Club would go on to represent Ontario at the 1997 Labatt Brier in Calgary, Alberta. It was Werenich's 10th and final provincial title of his career, which included World Championships in 1983 and 1990.

Standings
Final standings

Scores

February 4
Draw 1 
Steski 9-7 Harris 
Base 9-8 Walsh
Howard 9-4 Moffatt
Middaugh 9-7 Corner
Werenich 6-5 Breivik

Draw 2 
Werenich 8-6 Base
Moffatt 8-2 Harris
Corner 7-5 Steski
Breivik 6-4 Walsh
Middaugh 5-2 Howard

February 5
Draw 3
Walsh 8-4 Howard
Breivik 7-4 Corner
Middaugh 7-1 Harris
Werenich 5-2 Moffatt
Steski 7-6 Base

Draw 4 
Corner 5-4 Harris
Base 8-6 Howard
Werenich 8-5 Walsh
Middaugh 5-2 Steski
Breivik 6-4 Moffatt

February 6
Draw 5
Steski 8-4 Moffatt
Werenich 11-10 Middaugh
Base 6-5 Breivik
Harris 8-7 Walsh
Howard 7-5 Corner

Draw 6
Middaugh 11-5 Breivik
Howard 8-7 Steski
Walsh 9-0 Corner
Moffatt 8-2 Base
Harris 7-4 Werenich

February 7
Draw 7 
Corner 6-4 Base
Harris 8-2 Breivik
Middaugh 6-5 Moffatt
Werenich 6-5 Howard
Steski 9-6 Walsh

Draw 8
Moffatt 7-5 Walsh
Corner 8-3 Werenich
Howard 6-5 Harris
Steski 7-4 Breivik
Middaugh 9-7 Base

Draw 9
Howard 10-1 Breivik
Middaugh 8-5 Walsh
Werenich 9-4 Steski
Harris 8-2 Base
Moffatt 6-3 Corner

Tie Breaker

Playoffs

References

External links
Coverage on CurlingZone

Ontario Nokia Cup
Ontario Tankard
Sport in Guelph
Nokia Cup
Ontario Nokia Cup